Mastanabal "Masta" Kacher (born 8 November 1995) is an Algerian professional footballer.

Early life
Kacher was born in Azazga, Algeria, before emigrating to Canada with his family at age six.

Club career

FC Montreal
Kacher had been a member of the Montreal Impact's academy since its inception in 2011. In March 2015, it was announced that Kacher would play for FC Montreal, the USL reserve club of the Montreal Impact in their inaugural season.  He made his professional debut for the club in a 2–0 defeat to Toronto FC II. Kacher would spend two seasons with FC Montreal before the club ceased operations after the 2016 season, a decision which he would be critical of.

Colorado Springs Switchbacks
On 17 January 2017, it was announced that Kacher had joined Colorado Springs Switchbacks FC of the United Soccer League. Kacher would start every match for the Switchbacks in the 2017 season, scoring 8 goals. It was announced on January 16 that the Switchbacks had brought Kacher back for the 2018 season, but less than a month later on 12 February Kacher was unexpectedly released from the club. Kacher was the only USL player to have started all 32 games during the 2017 season.

Real Monarchs
The same day Kacher was released, he signed with Real Monarchs, the United Soccer League reserve club of Real Salt Lake. In his second game with Real Monarchs, Kacher scored a brace in a 3-1 defeat of Seattle Sounders FC 2. He made 24 league appearances in 2018, scoring three goals. The following season, he made fourteen appearances, scoring one goal.

Saint Louis FC
On 16 July 2019, Kacher made a mid-season move to Saint Louis FC. With Saint Louis, he made fifteen appearances that season.

Valour FC
On 3 April 2020, Kacher signed with Canadian Premier League side Valour FC. He made his debut for Valour on 16 August against Cavalry FC. In January 2022 he departed club.

FC Edmonton
On 17 February 2022, Kacher signed with FC Edmonton.

References

External links
 
 USSF Development Academy bio

1995 births
Living people
Association football midfielders
Algerian footballers
Canadian soccer players
Soccer people from Quebec
People from Azazga
Canadian people of Kabyle descent
Kabyle people
Algerian emigrants to Canada
Naturalized citizens of Canada
Algerian expatriate footballers
Canadian expatriate soccer players
Expatriate soccer players in the United States
Algerian expatriate sportspeople in the United States
Canadian expatriate sportspeople in the United States
Montreal Impact U23 players
FC Montreal players
Colorado Springs Switchbacks FC players
Real Monarchs players
Saint Louis FC players
Valour FC players
FC Edmonton players
Canadian Soccer League (1998–present) players
USL Championship players
Canadian Premier League players